Claire Barrow is an English artist. Known for her unique hand painted leather jackets and caricature illustrations, Barrow does not view being an artist and a designer as mutually exclusive, but rather integrates both aspects into her work. Barrow is currently based in London, using British culture as an inspiration in her art. Barrow is, also, inspired by the idea of consumerism and its effect on art. She, like Burberry, has rejected traditional ideas of the fashion system and announced in 2021 that she would no longer show her designs in accordance with the traditional seasonal model, preferring to focus on creating fashion and art without the motivation of consumerism.

Life 
Barrow grew up in Stockton-on-Tees in northeast England. Barrow studied at Conyers School in Middlesbrough and did a BTEC National Diploma in Fashion Design at Cleveland College of Art and Design (now the Northern School of Art) before she moved to London in 2008 to study Fashion at the University of Westminster. In 2012 she graduated from the University of Westminster with a degree in Fashion Design. Before graduating she got her first big break from the fashion editor at British Vogue, Fransesca Burns. One of her hand painted leather jackets was featured in Vogue, another in i-D and another on Rihanna. Despite the break in her career Barrow still finished her degree. After her graduate collection was featured on the catwalk Fashion East founder Lulu Kennedy quickly picked her up. Just one year after her graduate collection she made her London Fashion Week debut with Fashion East and then began exhibiting with NEWGEN.

Style 
Barrow has defined her own style as "car boot sale". Others have described her style as neo-primitivism. Barrow has grown tired of people inquiring whether she's a fashion designer or artist. She explained in an interview," The question is always, ‘Is it fashion or art?’" this prompted "the Retro-Spective" her own fake retrospective which combined the two demonstrating that she's both an artist and a fashion designer.

Selected works 
2015: Same Shoes, M Goldstein Gallery, London. 
2017: Dancing with Dreams, Galeria Melissa, London.

Selected exhibitions 
2016: Fish Wifes, (with Reba Maybury) Paramount Ranch, Agoura Hills, California.
2016: Retro-Spective, Institute of Contemporary Arts, London.
2016: The Bed, the Bath and The Beyond, M Goldstein Gallery, London.

List of Barrow's collections 
Spring/Summer 2013 – Untitled
Autumn/Winter 2013 – Untitled
Spring/Summer 2014 – Untitled
Autumn/Winter 2014 – Untitled
Spring/Summer 2015 – Untitled
Autumn/Winter 2015 – High Flyers
Spring/Summer 2016 – Broken Machines
Autumn/Winter 2016 – Untitled

References

External links 

Official Website

Living people
English women painters
English illustrators
21st-century British painters
21st-century British women artists
Year of birth missing (living people)
20th-century English women
20th-century English people
21st-century English women
21st-century English people